The following are the appointments to various Canadian Honours of 2020. Usually, they are announced as part of the New Year and Canada Day celebrations and are published within the Canada Gazette during the year. This follows the custom set out within the United Kingdom which publishes its appoints of various British Honours for New Year's and for monarch's official birthday. However, instead of the midyear appointments announced on Victoria Day, the official birthday of the Canadian Monarch, this custom has been transferred with the celebration of Canadian Confederation and the creation of the Order of Canada

However, as the Canada Gazette publishes appointment to various orders, decorations and medal, either Canadian or from Commonwealth and foreign states, this article will reference all Canadians so honoured during the 2020 calendar year.

Provincial Honours are not listed within the Canada Gazette, however they are listed within the various publications of each provincial government. Provincial honours will be listed within this page as they are announced.

The Order of Canada

Companions of the Order of Canada

 Howard Alper, C.C. (This is a promotion within the Order)
 The Honourable Monique Bégin, P.C., C.C. (This is a promotion within the Order)
 Janette Bertrand, C.C., C.Q. (This is a promotion within the Order)
 Denise Filiatrault, C.C., O.Q. (This is a promotion within the Order)
 Tom Jackson, C.C. (This is a promotion within the Order)
 Thomas King, C.C. (This is a promotion within the Order)
 Phillip James Edwin Peebles, C.C., O.M. 
 Mark Roger Tewksbury, C.C., M.S.M.

Officers of the Order of Canada

 Alice Benjamin, O.C., C.Q.
 Philip Benjamin Berger, O.C., O.Ont.
 Martha Gertrude Muriel Billes, O.C.
 The Honourable William Alexander Blaikie, P.C., O.C.
 Jeffery Dahn, O.C.
 Jan den Oudsten, O.C.
 The Honourable William C. Graham, P.C., O.C., Q.C. (This is a promotion within the order)  
 Sandra Kirby, O.C.
 Marcia Vaune Jocelyn Kran, O.C.
 Eugenia Kumacheva, O.C.
 Linda Jane Leith, O.C.
 Sheldon Levy, O.C.
 Claude Meunier, O.C.
 John E. Peller, O.C.
 The Honourable François Rolland, O.C.
 Guy Rouleau, O.C., O.Q.
 John David Runnalls, O.C.
 Sara Seager, O.C.
 Elder Doreen Spence, O.C.
 Marc Tessier-Lavigne, O.C.
 Yosef Wosk, O.C., O.B.C.

Honorary Member of the Order of Canada
 Alfred E. Slinkard, C.M.

Members of the Order of Canada

 Ella Yoelli Amir, C.M.
 Cristina Amon, C.M.
 Ronald Duncan Barr, C.M.
 Christian Barthomeuf, C.M.
 Chief Darcy Bear, C.M., S.O.M.
 B. Lynn Beattie, C.M.
 Yves Beauchamp, C.M., C.Q.
 Izak Benbasat, C.M.
 Daniel R. Bereskin, C.M., Q.C.
 Judy Birdsell, C.M.
 Max Blouw, C.M.
 Allan Borodin, C.M.
 George Brookman, C.M.
 Alain Chartrand, C.M., C.Q.
 Robert Anthony Clark, C.M.
 Ronald Ivan Cohen, C.M., M.B.E.
 Liliane Colpron, C.M.
 Joseph Michael Connors, C.M.
 Jean Marc Dalpé, C.M.
 B. Denham Jolly, C.M.
 Sandra Djwa, C.M.
 Michel Doucet, C.M., O.N.B., Q.C.
 James M. Drake, C.M.
 Roger Dubois, C.M.
 Donald Gordon Duguid, C.M., O.M.
 Hoda ElMaraghy, C.M., O.Ont.
 Philip Michael Epstein, C.M., O.Ont., Q.C.
 John S. Eyking, C.M.
 William Fast, C.M.
 Edward Finn, C.M.
 Jackie Flanagan, C.M.
 William John Fox, C.M.
 The Honourable Joan Fraser, C.M.
 Timothy Frick, C.M., O.B.C.
 Ross William Glen, C.M.
 Robert Godin, C.M.
 Priscilla Edson Greenwood, C.M.
 David Grimes, C.M.
 Charles Roy Guest, C.M.
 Stanley Hamilton, C.M., O.B.C.
 Anthony Olmsted Hendrie, C.M.
 Carol Pearl Herbert, C.M.
 Gordon Hicks, C.M.
 Jagmohan Humar, C.M.
 Peter Daniel Alexander Jacobs, C.M.
 The Honourable Janis Guðrún Johnson, C.M.
 Maria Labrecque-Duchesneau, C.M., C.Q.
 John R. Lacey, C.M.
 Elizabeth Langley, C.M.
 Gérard Raymond Le Chêne, C.M., C.Q.
 Michele Leering, C.M.
 Jacques Légaré, C.M.
 Elliot Lifson, C.M.
 William Macdonald, C.M.
 Judy Matthews, C.M.
 Harvey Andrew McCue (Waubageshig), C.M.
 Brian McFarlane, C.M.
 Lucy Lynn McIntyre, C.M.
 John H. McNeill, C.M.
 Sarah Milroy, C.M.
 Scott Moir, C.M.
 Menka Nagrani, C.M.
 Jacques Nantel, C.M.
 Peggy Nash, C.M.
 Glenn O’Farrell, C.M.
 Marietta Orlov, C.M. (deceased)
 Marc Parent, C.M.
 Serge Payette, C.M., C.Q.
 Christina Petrowska Quilico, C.M.
 Crystal Pite, C.M.
 Anthony Robin Poole, C.M.
 Brian Postl, C.M., O.M.
 Tom Radford, C.M.
 The Honourable Allan Michael Rock, P.C., C.M., O.Ont., Q.C.
 Lorio Roy, C.M.
 Vera Schiff, C.M.
 Stefan Glenn Sigurdson, C.M., Q.C.
 Lara St. John, C.M.
 Dave William Thomas, C.M.
 Tessa Virtue, C.M.
 Peter Warrian, C.M.
 David P. Wilkinson, C.M.
 Kenneth L. Wilson, C.M.
 Roger Wong, C.M.

Order of Military Merit

Commanders of the Order of Military Merit

 Major-General Peter Samson Dawe, C.M.M., M.S.M., C.D. (This is a promotion within the Order)
 Vice-Admiral Haydn Clyde Edmundson, C.M.M., M.S.M., C.D. (This is a promotion within the Order)
 Major-General Blaise Francis Frawley, C.M.M., C.D. (This is promotion within the Order)  
 Major-General Joseph Jean-Marie Jocelyn Paul, C.M.M., M.S.C., C.D.
 Major-General William Francis Seymour, C.M.M., C.D.

Officers of the Order of Military Merit

 Colonel Christopher Charles Ayotte, O.M.M., C.D.
 Brigadier-General Derek Dickson Basinger, O.M.M., C.D.
 Lieutenant-Colonel Lisa Baspaly, O.M.M., C.D.
 Colonel Denis Pierre Gérard Guy Pierre Boucher, O.M.M., C.D.
 Captain(N) Jason Robert Boyd, O.M.M., M.S.M., C.D.
 Lieutenant-Colonel Allan Gregory Dengis, O.M.M., C.D.
 Colonel John William Errington, O.M.M., M.S.M., C.D.
 Commander Deborah-Lynn Gates, O.M.M., C.D.
 Lieutenant-Colonel Dean Paul Gresko, O.M.M., C.D.
 Lieutenant-Colonel Vanessa Maria Hanrahan, O.M.M., C.D.
 Brigadier-General Kevin Gregory Horgan, O.M.M., C.D.
 Colonel Steven James Hunter, O.M.M., M.S.C., M.S.M., C.D.
 Brigadier-General Mario Leblanc, O.M.M., M.S.M., C.D.
 Colonel Dwayne Michael Lemon, O.M.M., M.S.C., C.D.
 Colonel Shawn Lawrence Marley, O.M.M., C.D.
 Colonel John Paul Scott McKenzie, O.M.M., C.D.
 Brigadier-General Mark Misener, O.M.M., M.S.M., C.D.
 Lieutenant-Colonel Heather Suzanne Morrison, O.M.M., C.D.
 Colonel Alan Paul Mulawyshyn, O.M.M., C.D.
 Colonel Denis Paul O’Reilly, O.M.M., C.D.
 Colonel Keith Edward Osmond, O.M.M., C.D.
 Colonel George Bradley Thomson, O.M.M., C.D.

Members of the Order of Military Merit

 Ranger Kimberly Ann Andersen, M.M.M., C.D.
 Chief Warrant Officer Richard Robert Biddiscombe, M.M.M., C.D.
 Warrant Officer Daniel Bonhomme, M.M.M., C.D.
 Sergeant Shelley Lynn Boswell, M.M.M., C.D.
 Master Warrant Officer Steve Joseph Roger Alfred Chagnon, M.M.M., C.D.
 Petty Officer 2nd Class Rebecca Michal Charlesworth, M.M.M., C.D.
 Master Warrant Officer Marcel Armand Rheo Chenier, M.M.M., C.D.
 Captain Matthew Paul Clark, M.M.M., C.D.
 Master Warrant Officer Stéphane Cloutier, M.M.M., C.D.
 Chief Warrant Officer Donald Charles Colombe, M.M.M., C.D.
 Warrant Officer Isabelle Marie Réjeanne Corbeil, M.M.M., C.D.
 Chief Warrant Officer Joseph Jacques Marco Côté, M.M.M., C.D.
 Master Warrant Officer Joseph Jonathan Charles Côté, M.M.M., C.D.
 Master Warrant Officer Robin Nicolas Côté, M.M.M., C.D.
 Chief Warrant Officer Mark Steven Delarosbil, M.M.M., C.D.
 Master Warrant Officer Mark Robertson Denney, M.M.M., C.D.
 Warrant Officer Catharine Anne Devlin, M.M.M., C.D.
 Major Daniel Alexandre Doran, M.M.M., C.D.
 Master Warrant Officer Frédéric François Alexandre Duchesneau, M.M.M., C.D.
 Warrant Officer Michael Joseph Dwyer, M.M.M., C.D.
 Chief Petty Officer 2nd Class Peter Kent Ellerbeck, M.M.M., C.D.
 Warrant Officer Martin Falardeau, M.M.M., C.D.
 Warrant Officer Robbie Mark Fraser, M.M.M., C.D.
 Warrant Officer John Peter James Gallagher, M.M.M., M.S.M., C.D.
 Chief Petty Officer 2nd Class Philip Murray Gormley, M.M.M., M.S.M., C.D.
 Chief Warrant Officer Gary Lynden Cliffe Grant, M.M.M., M.S.M., C.D.
 Warrant Officer Audrey Gravelle, M.M.M., C.D.
 Master Warrant Officer Mario Grondin, M.M.M., C.D.
 Ranger Peter Matthew Gull, M.M.M., C.D.
 Petty Officer 1st Class Dana Andrew Joseph Haley, M.M.M., C.D.
 Warrant Officer Justin Kane Harper, M.M.M., C.D.
 Chief Warrant Officer Michele Dawn Harris, M.M.M., C.D.
 Sergeant Joanne Marie Henneberry, M.M.M., C.D.
 Master Warrant Officer Sheldon Wayne Herritt, M.M.M., C.D.
 Petty Officer 1st Class Andy Kirk Raymond Hewlett, M.M.M., C.D.
 Chief Warrant Officer Paul Justin Holwell, M.M.M., C.D.
 Warrant Officer James Adam Hunter, M.M.M., M.S.M., C.D.
 Chief Warrant Officer Graham Andrew James, M.M.M., C.D.
 Master Warrant Officer Anthony Hewitt Jones, M.M.M., C.D.
 Master Warrant Officer Lisa Anne Kachanoski, M.M.M., C.D.
 Warrant Officer James Andrew King, M.M.M., C.D.
 Master Warrant Officer André Lamarre, M.M.M., C.D.
 Master Warrant Officer Daniel Michel Landry, M.M.M., C.D.
 Warrant Officer Danielle Amber Langley, M.M.M., C.D.
 Master Warrant Officer Joel Albert Langley, M.M.M., C.D.
 Warrant Officer Bruno Hugo Lapointe, M.M.M., C.D.
 Chief Warrant Officer Joseph Serge Rémy Lapointe, M.M.M., C.D.
 Chief Warrant Officer Grant Lawson, M.M.M., C.D.
 Lieutenant Martin Claude Le Blanc, M.M.M., C.D.
 Major Erica Anne Lidington, M.M.M.
 Chief Petty Officer 2nd Class Tari Lyn Lightwood, M.M.M., C.D.
 Master Warrant Officer Robert Dave Limon, M.M.M., C.D.
 Sergeant Christina Lee Marie Litschel, M.M.M., C.D.
 Petty Officer 2nd Class Derek Lewis Lougher-Goodey, M.M.M., C.D.
 Chief Warrant Officer Mary Margaret MacDonald, M.M.M., C.D.
 Sergeant Réjean Joseph Lucien Martel, M.M.M., C.D.
 Master Warrant Officer Michael John Martens, M.M.M., C.D.
 Warrant Officer Liam Robert McGlynn, M.M.M., C.D.
 Warrant Officer Mark Meyer, M.M.M., C.D.
 Chief Warrant Officer Abdul Hafeez Mullick, M.M.M., C.D.
 Chief Warrant Officer Derek Howard Murphy, M.M.M., C.D.
 Master Warrant Officer Allana Mary Nicholas, M.M.M., C.D.
 Chief Warrant Officer Charles August O’Donnell, M.M.M., C.D.
 Major Sheldon Ernest Penney, M.M.M., C.D.
 Petty Officer 1st Class Nelson Pinherio Pereira, M.M.M., C.D.
 Master Warrant Officer Bruno Plamondon, M.M.M., C.D.
 Petty Officer 1st Class Pierre-Luc Joseph Reynold Poirier-Potvin, M.M.M., C.D.
 Warrant Officer Sheldon Charles Quinn, M.M.M., C.D.
 Sergeant Christopher William Rambharose, M.M.M., S.M.V., C.D.
 Master Warrant Officer Shane Wilson Ringer, M.M.M., C.D.
 Major Jean Pascal Roy, M.M.M., C.D.
 Warrant Officer Joseph Aaron Schamerhorn, M.M.M., C.D.
 Master Warrant Officer Incoronata Scuncio, M.M.M., C.D.
 Chief Warrant Officer Donna Louise Smit, M.M.M., C.D.
 Captain Gregory Allan Smit, M.M.M., S.C., M.S.M., C.D.
 Petty Officer 1st Class Cecil Jason Sparkes, M.M.M., S.C., C.D.
 Master Warrant Officer Ryan David Stout, M.M.M., C.D.
 Lieutenant(N) Michael Thomas St-Pierre, M.M.M., C.D.
 Sergeant Stacy Lynn Taylor, M.M.M.
 Master Warrant Officer Travis Urban Trussler, M.M.M., C.D.
 Petty Officer 1st Class Darcy Louise Webb, M.M.M., C.D.
 Warrant Officer Danielle Mary Winters, M.M.M., C.D.
 Master Warrant Officer Joseph Charles Eugène Jonathan Lacoste, M.M.M., C.D.

Order of Merit of the Police Forces

Commander of the Order of Merit of the Police Forces

 Chief Constable Anthony Adam Palmer, C.O.M. - This is a promotion within the Order

Officers of the Order of Merit of the Police Forces

 Inspector Lisa Byrne, O.O.M.
 Commissioner Thomas W. B. Carrique, O.O.M. - This is a promotion within the Order
 Deputy Chief Shawna Michelle Coxon, O.O.M.
 Chief Wayne Gerard Gallant, O.O.M. - This is a promotion within the Order
 Chief Bryan Michael Larkin, O.O.M. - This is a promotion within the Order
 Deputy Chief Robin Emmanuel McNeil, O.O.M. - This is a promotion within the Order
 Chief Paul E. Pedersen, O.O.M.- This is a promotion within the Order
 Deputy Chief Constable Satwinder Rai, O.O.M. - This is a promotion within the Order
 Assistant Commissioner Stephanie Marie Sachsse, O.O.M.
 Provincial Commander Mary Ann Silverthorn, O.O.M. - This is a promotion within the Order
 Inspector Clare Elizabeth Smart, O.O.M.
 Chief Constable Leslie John Sylven, O.O.M. - This is a promotion within the Order

Honorary Member of the Order of Merit of the Police Forces
 Colonel Giorgio Tommaseo, M.O.M.

Members of the Order of Merit of the Police Forces

 Superintendent Steven Channing Barlow, M.O.M.
 Inspector Christopher D. Barry, M.O.M.
 Deputy Director Simonetta Barth, M.O.M.
 Corporal Eugene J. L. Belliveau, M.O.M.
 Superintendent Thomas E. Berczi, M.O.M.
 Chief Superintendent Rhonda M. Blackmore, M.O.M.
 Detective Michael Alexander Cavilla, M.O.M.
 Assistant Commissioner Bernadine Arlene Chapman, M.O.M.
 Deputy Chief André Crawford, M.O.M.
 Assistant Commissioner Brian Francis Edwards, M.O.M.
 Chief Scott S. Gilbert, M.O.M.
 Sergeant Sandra Glendinning, M.O.M.
 Chief Superintendent Michael J. Good, M.O.M.
 Chief Superintendent Janis Bernadette Gray, M.O.M.
 Corporal David Paul Lane, M.O.M., C.D.
 Ms. Nadine A. Langlois, M.O.M.
 Director Francis Lanouette, M.O.M.
 Constable Richard Lavallee, M.O.M.
 Chief Superintendent Ian David Lawson, M.O.M.
 Superintendent Mark Le Page, M.O.M.
 Mr. Christopher Marc Lett, M.O.M.
 Chief Terry R. McCaffrey, M.O.M.
 Superintendent Colleen Anne McCormick, M.O.M.
 Reverend Thomas S. McCullagh, M.O.M.
 Deputy Chief Barbara McLean, M.O.M.
 Chief Superintendent Shahin Mehdizadeh, M.O.M.
 Mr. Gary V. Melanson, M.O.M.
 Superintendent William D. Merrylees, M.O.M.
 Superintendent Larry David Montgomery, M.O.M.
 Inspector Glenn Newman, M.O.M.
 Sergeant Major Douglas Selby Pack, M.O.M.
 Staff Sergeant Ronald B. Parker, M.O.M.
 Superintendent Jason Walter Popik, M.O.M.
 Deputy Chief Dean R. Rae, M.O.M.
 Superintendent Elija Andrew Rain, M.O.M.
 Superintendent Gary Douglas Ross, M.O.M.
 Deputy Director Sophie Roy, M.O.M.
 Deputy Chief Jeffery Skye, M.O.M.
 Director Simmie Smith, M.O.M.
 Superintendent Grant Martin Ezra St. Germaine, M.O.M.
 Constable John David Stewart, M.O.M.
 Deputy Chief Kevin Thaler, M.O.M.
 Inspector Sharon Barbara Warren, M.O.M.
 Deputy Chief Sheilah Weber, M.O.M.
 Superintendent Fiona Wilson, M.O.M.
 Inspector Colleen Yee, M.O.M.

Most Venerable Order of the Hospital of St. John of Jerusalem

Dame Grand Cross
 Mairi Christina Arthur

Knights and Dames of the Order of St. John
 Jean Kathryn Chute
 Lynn M. Cook
 David James Hook
 Alain Louis Joseph Laurencelle
 His Honour the Honourable Russell Mirasty, M.S.M.
 Her Honour the Honourable Brenda Murphy, O.N.B.

Commanders of the Order of St. John
 Mary Kingston
 Kim Juanita Laing
 Christopher Paul McCreery, M.V.O.
 Kevin R. Morgan
 Raymond Ormerod
 Lieutenant Colonel Victor Rodney Paddon, O.M.M., C.D. (Retired)
 The Reverend Canon Christopher Bennett Jethro Pratt

Officers of the Order of St. John
 Peter Harvey Dwight Blok
 Patricia Coleman
 James Daniel Coucill
 Sergeant Stephane Joseph Emillien Gagne, C.D.
 Dianne Gail Hennig, C.D.
 Cindy Carol Maitre
 J. Francis Malley
 Jonathan William Peppler
 John Gregory Peters, M.V.O.
 John Michael Prno
 Marsha E. Seens
 Andrew Wright Stanzel
 Margaret Wynn Wicklum
 Steve Wai-Kit Woo

Members of the Order of St. John
 Elizabeth Mary Anderson
 Edward Michael Barner
 Peter Ian Beliveau
 Judith Ann Bell
 Susan Melissa Bendzak
 Nancy Catherine Berlett
 Lindsay Blanchette
 Gaby William Boutin
 Christopher Richard Brooks
 Lois Brown
 Henry Ying Fun Chow
 Michael Cohen
 Carine Couturier
 Debbie Edith Crozier
 Lhea Dawn Davidson
 Heather Joy De Santis
 Wendy Mae Donaldson
 Lieutenant-Colonel Robert Francis Elliott, O.M.M., C.D. (Retired)
 Robin Bruce Farquhar
 Paul Filkiewicz
 Catherine Joy Fletcher
 Brent James Fowler
 Adrienne Lorelle Ganton
 Donald James Garrish
 Gregory John Garrish
 Gabrielle Gendreau
 André-Claude Gendron
 Dallas Kent James Green
 Ghislain Guay
 Rayna Vale Hamilton
 John MacDonald Harper
 Major Ernest Francis Hughes, C.D. (Retired)
 Nicholas James Hume
 Martha Susan Keller
 Christine Esther Bujold Lacombe
 Brenda Elizabeth Lawson
 Denis Leblanc
 Jacob John Lee
 Beverly Anne Luiken
 Edward Ma
 Craig Leslie Mantle
 Marilyn Elaine Martin
 William Gordon McDonald
 Jane Elizabeth McIntosh
 Deborah Catherine McLay
 Paul Glenn McLay
 Kellyann Tekarihwenháiwi Meloche
 William John Mewhort
 Alain Miclette
 Chaneen Nomek Miller
 Manuel A. Montero, C.D.
 Tessa Morelli
 Martin Parent
 Amanda Morrison-Penny
 Paul Eric Pederson, M.O.M.
 Douglas James Penner, C.D.
 Patrice Olivier Jean-Marc Pinard-Dostie
 Barbara Jean Poison
 Major Alphonse Proulx (Retired)
 Francois Provost
 Anne Ramsoomair
 Diana Lynn Randall
 Jerry Lyall Rankin
 Joshua Louis Reitzel
 Geraldine Elizabeth Redmond
 Madeleine Mary Robertson
 Sarah Schorno
 Anna Stefek
 Captain Christian Stenner, C.D.
 Sheilagh Elizabeth Stewart
 Johanne St-Germain
 Pier-Luc Vocal
 Anna-Maria Gayle White
 Amanda Leota Wood

Provincial honours

National Order of Québec

Grand Officer
 Guy Rocher

Officers
 Renaldo Battista
 Ivan Bernier
 Guy Breton
 Sophie Brochu 
 Brian Bronfman 
 Louise Caouette-Laberge
 Fernand Dansereau
 Jean-Pierre Ménard
 Serge Ménard
 Suzanne Sauvage
 David Saint-Jacques
 Jean-Marc Vallée
 Jean-P. Vezina

Knights
 Steve Barakatt
 Louis Bernatchez
 Charles Binamé
 Marcel Boyer
 Madeleine Careau
 Guillaume Côté
 Mario Cyr
 Gaston Déry 
 Claire Deschênes
 Johanne Elsener
 Anne-Marie Hubert
 Florence Junca-Adenot 
 Louise Latraverse
 Andrew Molson
 Ali Nestor
 Michèle Ouimet
 Morag Park
 Claude Provencher
 Jennifer Stoddart
 Sophie Thibault
 Sylvie Vachon

Saskatchewan Order of Merit

 Dr. Gordon Asmundson
 Rigmor Clarke
 Sally Elliott
 Gerald Grandey
 Dr. Donald Greve
 Dr. Lorne Hepworth
 Pamela Klein
 Silvia Martini
 Eloise Sitter
 Dr. Walter Streelasky

Order of Ontario

 Daniel Allen
 Dr. Joseph Raymond Buncic, C.M.
 Michael DeGasperis
 Dr. Raymond Desjardins
 Ernest Eves, Q.C.
 Hershell Ezrin
 Carlo Fidani
 Karen Goldenberg
 Michael Deane Harris
 Ellis Jacob, C.M.
 Dr. Jing Jiang
 Dr. Shana O. Kelley
 Dr. André Lapierre
 Dale Lastman, C.M.
 André M. Levesque
 Dr. Peter Liu
 Hazel McCallion, C.M.
 Arden McGregor
 Janet McKelvy
 George McLean
 Hon. Rosemary Moodie
 Hon. Bob Runciman
 Dr. Marilyn Sonley
 Ahmad Reza Tabrizi
 Hon. Karen M. Weiler, C.M.

Order of British Columbia

 Shashi Assanand
 Ryan Beedie
 Michael Bublé, O.C.
 Shirley Chan
 Neil Cook, M.G.C.
 Paul George
 Rusty Goepel
 John Malcolm Horton
 Dr. Mel Krajden
 Dr. Janet Nadine Mort
 Tracy Porteous
 Carole Taylor, O.C.
 Ruth Williams

Alberta Order of Excellence 

 JudyLynn Archer
 Jim Boucher
 Charlie Fischer (posthumous)
 Frances Harley
 John Mah
 Holger Petersen
 Ed Stelmach

Order of Prince Edward Island 

 Olive Bryanton
 Henry Purdy
 B.E. "Bev" Simpson

Order of Manitoba 

 Dr. Stephen Borys
 Mitch Bourbonniere
 Elder Mary Courchene
 Dr. Krishnamurti Dakshinamurti
 Bill Elliott
 Richard Frost
 Tina Jones
 Dr. Marion Lewis, O.C.
 Margaret Morse
 Stuart Murray
 Scott Oake
 Dr. Ernest Rady

Order of New Brunswick 

 Patricia Bernard
 Héliodore Côté
 Michel Doucet
 Léo Johnson
 Lois Scott
 Robyn Tingley
 Abraham Beverley Walker
 James "Jim" Wilson
 Claire Wilt
 John Wood

Order of Nova Scotia 

 Linda Best
 Stella Bowles
 David G. Fountain, C.M.
 Natalie MacMaster, C.M.
 The Hon. Dr. Donald Oliver, C.M., Q.C.
 Shawna Y. Paris-Hoyte

Order of Newfoundland and Labrador 

No appointments were made during 2020 due to the COVID-19 pandemic.

Territorial honours

Order of Nunavut 

The 2020 appointments to the Order of Nunavut have not been announced.

Order of the Northwest Territories 

The 2020 appointments to the Order of the Northwest Territories have not been announced; the investiture has been postponed due to COVID-19.

Order of Yukon 

 Bess Cooley
 Keith Byram
 Doug Phillips
 Jack Cable
 William Klassen
 Frances Woolsey
 Dr. Sally MacDonald
 Gertie Tom
 Agnes Mills
 The Hon. Ron Veale

Canadian Bravery Decorations

Star of Courage 
 Aaron Grant Gibbons (posthumous)

Medal of Bravery 

 Constable Marc-André Arpin
 Constable Annie Arseneau
 Constable Kyle Aucoin
 Irene Margaret Bell
 Commander Patrice Bigras
 Kyle Busquine
 Julio Cabrera
 Julie Callaghan
 Constable Jeffrey Czarnecki
 Sandra Desnomie
 Jehangir Faisal
 Constable Jimmy Hébert
 Yvonne Kanis
 Christopher Ellis Lawless
 Adam Matson
 Daniel Joseph McKinney
 Max Milan
 Constable Paul Morin
 Constable Marco Pagliericci
 Constable Danny Paquette
 Edward Reese
 Stephen Ross
 Bradley Schroeder
 Jonathan Stein-Palmiere (posthumous)
 Emilie Stevens
 Sergeant Hughes Thibault
 Keiren J. Tompkins
 Mark Oscar Tuura
 Dwayne Voth
 Sylvain Beauchamp
 Charlie Brien
 Constable Daryl Case
 Debbra Cooper
 Kimberly Cossette
 Jacob Fournier-Barnaby
 Constable Jean-Philip Gagnon
 Régis Grégoire
 Kai Hirvonen
 Christopher McManus-Lowson
 Peter Slipp
 Chris Scott
 Sébastien Vallerand
 Constable Stéphane Veilleux
 Constable David Wynn (posthumous)

Meritorious Service Decorations

Meritorious Service Cross (Military Division) 

 Brigadier-General Joseph Raymond Marc Gagné, O.M.M., M.S.M., C.D.
 Colonel Robert Brian Irwin, C.D.
 Lieutenant-Colonel Steven Kelly MacBeth, M.S.M., C.D.
 Colonel Christopher Alan McKenna, O.M.M., M.S.M., C.D.
 Lieutenant-Colonel Christopher Wayne Morrison, C.D.
 Admiral James G. Foggo III of the United States Navy

Meritorious Service Cross (Civil Division) 
 Nahid Aboumansour, C.Q., M.S.C.
 Ian M. F. Arnold, M.S.C.
 Darcy Ataman, M.S.C.
 Robert T. Banno, M.S.C. (deceased)
 Kathryn Marie Blain, M.S.C.
 Sandy Boutin, M.S.C.
 Franca Damiani Carella, M.S.C. (posthumous)
 Henry Gourdji, M.S.C., C.D.
 Mackie Terris Greene, M.S.C.
 Joseph Michael Howlett, M.S.C. (posthumous)
 Harry Ing, M.S.C.
 Nicole Marcil-Gratton, C.Q., M.S.C. (posthumous)
 Matthew Pearce, M.S.C.
 Jonathan Pitre, M.S.C. (posthumous)
 Grégory Sadetsky, M.S.C.
 Byron Smith, M.S.C.
 Wanda vanderStoop, M.S.C.
 Michèle Viau-Chagnon, C.Q., M.S.C.

Second Award of the Meritorious Service Medal (Military Division) 
Colonel Joshua James Major, M.S.M., C.D.

Meritorious Service Medal (Military Division) 

 Major Mathieu Liam Chêne Arseneault, C.D.
 Sergeant Marc-André Joseph Jacques Bastille
 Warrant Officer Marcel Yan Boursier, M.M.M., C.D.
 Master Seaman Rebecca Michal Charlesworth, C.D.
 Chief Warrant Officer John Castel Copeland, M.M.M., C.D.
 Commander Nathan George Decicco, C.D.
 Major Cullen Patrick Downey, C.D.
 Warrant Officer Marc Joseph Claude Gérard Dumont, C.D.
 Major Alexander Stewart Duncan, C.D.
 Petty Officer 2nd Class Justin Robert Dale Furman, C.D.
 Chief Warrant Officer Vincent Ronald Gagnon, M.M.M., C.D.
 Major Joseph Marie Marc Yan Gauthier, C.D.
 Major Patrick Clancy Gilbride
 Lieutenant-Colonel Marie Aimée Julie Grand’Maison, C.D.
 Lieutenant(N) Frederick Raymond Joseph, C.D.
 Lieutenant-Colonel Kieran Keith Kennedy, C.D.
 Lieutenant-Colonel James Timothy Kenney, C.D.
 Lieutenant-Colonel Joshua Andrew Klemen, C.D.
 Ordinary Seaman Frédéric Lapointe
 Lieutenant-Colonel Pierre Alexandre Leroux, C.D.
 Honorary Captain(N) Mark Roderick McQueen
 Colonel Joseph Laurier Serge Ménard, C.D.
 Chief Warrant Officer Steven Vincent Merry, M.M.M., C.D.
 Chief Warrant Officer Justin Francis Morneau, M.M.M., C.D.
 Master Warrant Officer Joseph André Robert Nadeau, C.D.
 Colonel Cayle Ian Oberwarth, C.D.
 Master Seaman Francisco Joaquim Grilo Peredo
 Master Corporal Sébastien Lionel Renaud
 Captain Paul Schouten (Kingdom of the Netherlands)
 Leading Seaman Collin François Damien Maël Johan Teasdale, C.D.
 Major Frank Michael Bird, C.D.
 Sergeant Timothy Jay Blindback, C.D.
 Chief Petty Officer 1st Class Shawn Paul Coates, C.D.
 Lieutenant-Colonel Raphaël Joseph Léon Jocelyn Guay, C.D.
 Lieutenant-Colonel Sonny Thomas Hatton, C.D.
 Colonel Jason Gabriel Langelier, O.M.M., C.D.
 Colonel Joseph Daniel Stéphane Masson, C.D.
 Lieutenant-Colonel Gordon James Peckham, C.D.
 Commander Peter Scott Robinson, C.D.
 Chief Petty Officer 1st Class Daniel Joseph Savard, C.D.
 Brigadier General Daniel Lawrence Simpson of the United States Air Force
 Brigadier-General Nicolas Dan Stanton, O.M.M., C.D.
 Chief Warrant Officer David Charles Tofts, M.M.M., C.D.

Meritorious Service Medal (Civil Division) 
 Adrian Bercovici, M.S.M.
 Natalie Bercovici, M.S.M.
 Yves Ernest Berthiaume, M.S.M.
 Subhas (Sam) Bhargava, M.S.M.
 Uttra Bhargava, M.S.M.
 Tina Boileau, M.S.M.
 Deborrah Sharon Bradwell, M.S.M.
 Kenneth Bradwell, M.S.M. (posthumous)
 Michael Andrew Burns, M.S.C., M.S.M.
 Louise Joanne Foster-Martin, M.S.M.
 John Timothy Goddard, M.S.M.
 Todd Alan Halpern, M.S.M.
 Jim Hayhurst Sr., M.S.M. (posthumous)
 Alexis Kearney Hillyard, M.S.M.
 Mike David Hirschbach, M.S.M.
 Jacques Jean Simon Janson, M.S.M.
 Superintendent Heinz A. J. Kuck, M.S.M. (retired)
 Véronique Leduc, M.S.M.
 Gerard Barry Losier, O.N.B., M.S.M.
 Taylor MacGillivray, M.S.M.
 Alan Melanson, M.S.M.
 Glori Meldrum, M.S.M.
 James Mercer, M.S.M.
 Fred Monk, M.S.M.
 Dean Otto, M.S.M.
 Jeanine Otto, M.S.M.
 Mavis I. Ramsey, M.S.M.
 Ron J. Ramsey, M.S.M.
 Mike Paul Ranta, M.S.M.
 Sylvie Rémillard, M.S.M.
 Kennith James Skwleqs Robertson, M.S.M.
 Catherine Ross, M.S.M.
 Jane Adele Roy, M.S.M.
 Jeremie Saunders, M.S.M.
 James Scott, M.S.M.
 Ariel Shlien, M.S.M.
 Ron Shlien, M.S.M.
 Peter Smyth, M.S.M.
 Brian Matthew Stever, M.S.M.
 Jean-Pierre Tchang, M.S.M.
 Iyabode Lanre Tunji-Ajayi, M.S.M.
 Sylvana Villata-Micillo, M.S.M.

Mention in Dispatches 
 Master Corporal Shawn Douglas Orme, C.D.
 Sergeant James Gordon Sanford, C.D.

Sovereign's Medal for Volunteers 

 Qapik Attagutsiak
 Lieutenant-Colonel Michael Bisson, C.D.
 John Bryant
 Patricia Cimmeck
 Alan Davidson
 Lieutenant(N) Joseph Dollis, C.D.
 Sean Donohue
 Pearl Dorey
 Dale Drysdale, C.D.
 Gilles Dubé
 Private William Dwyer, C.D.
 Susan Nelson Epstein
 Sean Falle
 Captain Jacques J. Gagne (Ret’d)
 Lisa Gausman
 Theresa Grabowski
 Darrell Helyar
 Gary Hewitt
 Jacquelin Holzman
 Greg Johnson
 Gwendolyn Johnston
 Master Warrant Officer Melissa Kehoe, C.D.
 Lieutenant-Colonel Mark James Levi Kennedy, C.D.
 Lewis Arlo King
 Sylvia Kitching
 Françoise Landry
 Monique Lavallée
 Warren Law
 Roméo Levasseur
 Corporal Brian Lussier, C.D.
 Leslie Anne Macaulay
 Charlene McInnis
 Robert Miller
 Micheline Morin
 Douglas Munroe
 Lieutenant Commander Donna Murakami, C.D.
 Brian North
 Brendan O’Donnell
 Douglas Paul Pflug
 June Raymond
 Jeffrey Smith
 Mark Symington
 Ralph Thomas
 Sharon Faye Thorne
 Richard Tobin
 Patricia Ellen Towell
 Reid Whynot
 Major William Worden, C.D.

Commonwealth and Foreign Orders, Decorations and Medal awarded to Canadians

From Her Majesty The Queen in Right of Australia

Order of Australia

Officer of the Order of Australia 
 Karim Khan

Member of the Order of Australia 
 Constance Seagram

Australian Operational Service Medal – Border Protection 
 Major Douglas Publicover
 Major Michael MacSween

From Her Majesty The Queen in Right of Jamaica

Badge of Honour for Meritorious Service 
 Ms. Marie Hackett
 Ms. Maria Sansait

Badge of Honour for Long and Faithful Service 
 Ms. Donna Marie Douglas
 Mr. Kenneth George Phillips
 Ms. Donna Pink Smith

From Her Majesty The Queen in Right of the United Kingdom

Most Excellent Order of the British Empire

Officer of the Most Excellent Order of the British Empire 
 Mr. Tony Sau-wo Yu
 Ms. Emer Timmons

Member of the Most Excellent Order of the British Empire 
 Ms. Gabrielle Naomi Eirew
 Mr. Jamil Malik
 Mr. Alan Marwood
 Mr. Erdem Moralioglu

British Empire Medal
 Ms. Nancy Southern
 Ms. Linda Southern-Heathcott

Operational Service Medal for Iraq and Syria with Clasp 
 Captain Lex Luciak

From the President of Austria

Grand Decoration of Honour for Services to the Republic of Austria 
 Mr. Roland Pirker
 Mr. Kurt Yakov Tutter

Austrian Cross of Honour for Science and Art, 1st Class 
 Mr. Joseph Patrouch

Gold Medal for Services to the Republic of Austria 
 Mr. Hugh Campbell
 Mrs. Robin Campbell

From His Majesty The King of the Belgians

Golden Palms of the Order of the Crown 
 Ms. Jacqueline Lyanga

Labour Decoration, Second Class 
 Ms. Rosa Dicembre

From the President of the Federative Republic of Brazil

Tamandaré Medal of Merit 
 Captain(N) Réal Brisson

From Her Majesty The Queen of Denmark

Knight of the Royal Order of the Dannebrog 
 Mr. Robert Seidel
 Ms. Helle Wilson

From the President of the Republic of Finland

First Class Medal of the Order of the White Rose of Finland, with gold cross 
 Ms. Eija Swenson

Order of the Lion of Finland

Commander
 The Honourable Eugene P. Rossiter

Knight
 Ms. Laura McSwiggan

From the President of the French Republic

National Order of the Legion of Honour

Commander of the National Order of the Legion of Honour 
 The Honourable Serge Joyal, P.C.

Knight of the National Order of the Legion of Honour
 Dr. Mona Nemer, C.M., C.Q.

Military Medal 

 Mr. André Louis Marie Oliviero

National Order of Merit

Officer of the National Order of Merit 
 Josette Villavarayan Bardon

Knight of the National Order of Merit 
 Anita Mathilde Dell
 Catherine Mounier
 Franck Point
 Danielle Weiler-Thaler

Order of the Academic Palms

Commander of the Order of the Academic Palms 
 Jean-Jacques Van Vlasselaer

Officer of the Order of the Academic Palms 
 Mr. Maurice Basque

Knight of the Order of the Academic Palms 
 Ms. Sophie Beaulé
 Dr. Claire Boudreau
 Ms. Monique Bournot-Trites
 Ms. Lace Marie Brogden
 Ms. Leila Marie Farah
 Mr. Feridun Hamdullahpur
 Mr. André Lamontagne
 Ms. Hélène Lefebvre
 Ms. Judith Plessis
 Mr. Chabane Bouaziz
 Ms. Magda Fusaro
 Ms. Zoubia Hadjadj
 Mr. Célestin Mbanianga
 Ms. Danièle Moore
 Ms. Nazanin Shahdi
 Mr. Richard Smith

Officer of the Order of Agricultural Merit 
 Mr. Michel Jacob

Order of Arts and Letters

Commander of the Order of Arts and Letters 
 Mr. Donald Sutherland

Officer of the Order of Arts and Letters 
 Mr. Pierre Auger
 Ms. Marie Chouinard
 Ms. Monique Cormier
 Ms. Jeannette Lajeunesse Zingg
 Mr. Pierre Lapointe
 Mr. Marshall Pynkoski
 Mr. Serge Quérin
 Mr. Robert Vézina
 Mr. Normand Charbonneau

Knight of the Order of Arts and Letters 
 Ms. Myriam Achard
 Mr. Christopher Butcher
 Ms. Suzanne Cyr
 Mr. Stan Douglas
 Ms. Karena Lam
 Mr. René Légère
 Ms. Ariane Moffatt
 Ms. Susan Point
 Mr. Denis Villeneuve

National Defence Medal, Bronze Echelon 

 Captain Brendan Alexander
 Lieutenant-Colonel John Benson
 Warrant Officer Louis Thivierge
 Chief Warrant Officer Joseph Martin Colbert
 Chief Superintendent Maureen Levy
 Lieutenant-Colonel Alexandre Dubois

Foreign Affairs Medal of Honour, Bronze Echelon 
 Mr. Philippe Pouet

From the President of the Federal Republic of Germany

Order of Merit of the Federal Republic of Germany

Knight Commander's Cross of the Order of Merit of the Federal Republic of Germany 
 The Honourable Rosalie Silberman Abella

Officer's Cross of the Order of Merit of the Federal Republic of Germany 
 Mr. Sibrandes Poppema

Cross of the Order of Merit of the Federal Republic of Germany 
 Ms. Alexandra Scheibler

From the President of Hungary

Officer's Cross of the Order of Merit of Hungary (Civil Division) 
 Mr. Frank Füredi

Knight's Cross of the Order of Merit of Hungary 
 Mr. Arthur M. Szabo

Gold Cross of Merit of Hungary 
 Mr. Sándor Balla
 Mr. István Savanya

Silver Cross of Merit of Hungary 
 Ms. Éva Alexandrovici Bottyán
 Ms. Mária Herédi
 Mr. Tibor Kocsis

From the President of the Italian Republic

Knight of the Order of the Star of Italy 
Mr. Mario Di Tommaso

From His Majesty The Emperor of Japan

Order of the Rising Sun

Gold Rays with Neck Ribbon 
 Mr. Réal Tanguay

Gold Rays with Rosette 
 Mr. Jean Dorion
 Mr. William James Lee

Gold and Silver Star 
 The Honourable Perrin Beatty

Gold and Silver Rays 
 Ms. Atsuko Bersma
 Mr. James Hutchings Taylor
 Mr. David Wesley Morrison
 Ms. Sanae Ohki
 Ms. Marie Meiko Ikeda
 Ms. Kumiko Lucy Yamashita

Silver Rays 
 Mr. Hiroshi Nakamura
 Mr. Peter Hiroshi Wakayama

From the President of the Republic of Korea

Order of Military Merit of the Republic of Korea 
 Sergeant Delphis Cormier (retired)

Order of Civil Merit of the Republic of Korea
 Mr. Guy Black

From the President of Latvia

Order of the Three Stars, Fourth Class 
 Mr. George Kenins
 Mr. Atis Otto Bredovskis
 Mr. Alberts Vitols

Cross of Recognition, Fourth Class 
 Ms. Laura Adlers
 Ms. Brigita Alks

From the President of the Republic of Moldova

Medal for Cooperation 
 Colonel Alexander Schwab

From the Secretary General of the North Atlantic Treaty Organization

NATO Meritorious Service Medal 

 Lieutenant-Colonel Colin Richardson
 Colonel Alexander Schwab
 Major-General Dany Fortin
 Major Gillian Parker

From His Majesty The King of Norway

Knight, 1st class of the Royal Norwegian Order of Merit 
 Mr. Robert Jette
 Ms. Heather Quale

From the Government of the Republic of Poland

Order of the White Eagle 
 Mr. Lucjan Krolikowski (posthumous)

Officer’s Cross of the Order of Merit of the Republic of Poland
 Mr. Juliusz Kirejczyk

Knight's Cross of the Order of Merit of the Republic of Poland 
 Mr. Kazimierz Chrapka

Order of Polonia Restituta

Officer's Cross of the Order of Polonia Restituta 
 Mr. Stefan Podsiadlo

Knight's Cross of the Order of Polonia Restituta 
 Mr. Adam Roman Leuchter

Gold Cross of Merit 
 Ms. Grazyna Galezowska
 Mr. Jerzy Kowalczyk
 Ms. Anna Barycka

Silver Cross of Merit 
 Ms. Lidia Dabrowska
 Ms. Katarzyna Szubert
 Mr. Alfred Zawadzki
 Ms. Maria Zlobicka
 Ms. Anna Czyzo

Bronze Cross of Merit 
 Ms. Bozena Szubert

Cross with Swords of the Order of the Cross of Independence 
 Mr. Stanislaw Jan Hardy (posthumous)

Cross of Freedom and Solidarity 

 Mr. Ryszard Kusmierczyk
 Mr. Mieczyslaw Partyka
 Ms. Barbara Anna Stewart
 Mr. Jan Toporowski
 Mr. Zbigniew Roman Wiewior
 Mr. Antoni Pawel Kaminski
 Mr. Zbigniew Labedzki (posthumous)

Siberian Exiles Cross 
 Mr. Lucjan Krolikowski (posthumous)
 Mr. Jerry Andrew Proskurnicki
 Mr. Boleslaw Gumulka
 Mr. Augustyn Noga (posthumous)

Long Marital Life Medal 
 Mrs. Iwonna Buczkowska
 Mr. Piotr Buczkowski
 Mrs. Zdzislawa Kazimiera Dziewierz
 Mr. Zdzislaw Piotr Dziewierz
 Mrs. Barbara Genowefa Kusilo
 Mr. Andrzej Grzegorz Kusilo
 Mrs. Irena Urbanowicz
 Mr. Jan Jozef Urbanowicz

From the President of the Russian Federation

Order of Friendship of the Russian Federation 
 Mr. Philip Esposito

From the President of the United States of America

Legion of Merit

Commander of the Legion of Merit 
 Vice-Admiral Maurice F. R. Lloyd
 Lieutenant-General Michael J. Hood

Officer of the Legion of Merit, First Oak Leaf Cluster 
 Lieutenant-General Wayne D. Eyre

Officer of the Legion of Merit 
 Brigadier-General Patrice J. R. Laroche
 Brigadier-General Conrad Mialkowski
 Brigadier-General François J. Chagnon
 Brigadier-General Marc R. Gagné
 Major-General Simon Hetherington
 Brigadier-General Michel-Henri St-Louis

Legionnaire of the Legion of Merit 
 Colonel Darron P. Bazin
 Colonel Christian Ouellette

Bronze Star Medal 

 Colonel Jean-François Cauden

Defence Meritorious Service Medal 

 Lieutenant-Colonel Annie Bergeron
 Major Jeffery G. Brownridge
 Lieutenant-Colonel Alain J. Dallaire
 Lieutenant-Colonel Andrew J. Duncan
 Major Gerhard N. Hildebrandt
 Master Warrant Officer Rodney A. Hutchinson
 Captain(N) Shawn P. Osborne
 Commander Samuel E. Patchell
 Major Rodney M. Redden
 Colonel Alexander T. Ruff
 Captain Paul P. Simmons
 Brigadier-General Nicolas D. Stanton
 Major Gregory P. Vander Kloet
 Lieutenant-Colonel Jason E. King
 Major Joseph Roland Stéphane Larrivée
 Major Francis J. C. P. Lavoie
 Major Dominic Adams-Robenhymer
 Inspector Robert Fulks
 Colonel Dominic Goulet
 Commander Lawrence Moraal
 Lieutenant-Commander Justin Raymond
 Lieutenant-Colonel Klaus Schneider
 Superintendent Andris Zarins

Meritorious Service Medal 

 Lieutenant-Commander Brennan B. Blanchfield
 Major Scott S. Leblanc
 Major Marcelo Plada
 Colonel Jean-François Cauden
 Major Sheri R. Lattemore
 Warrant Officer Paul E. Messier
 Lieutenant-Colonel Joseph R. Oldford
 Lieutenant-Colonel Wilfred P. Rellinger
 Major Timothy R. Van Mourik
 Lieutenant-Colonel J. C. Martin Arcand
 Chief Warrant Officer Andrew Rusconi

Air Medal, First Oak Leaf Cluster 

 Captain Byron R. Dennis
 Warrant Officer Kimberly L. Fournier
 Master Corporal Teal Smith

Air Medal 

 Major Michael J. Gohier
 Sergeant Barry W. Myers
 Master Corporal Brandon M. Banfield
 Captain Angela M. Hudson
 Master Corporal Damien Hocquard
 Major Matthew Jokela
 Sergeant Remi Lavoie
 Captain Kevin Long
 Sergeant Matthew Mochoruk
 Major David Murphy
 Major Neil Ryan
 Master Corporal Teal Smith

Erratums of Commonwealth and Foreign Orders, Decorations and Medal awarded to Canadians

Correction of 29 February 2020 

The notice published on page 4533 of the 28 December 2019, issue of the Canada Gazette, Part I, contained an error. Accordingly, the following modifications are made - Delete the following award: From the President of the French Republic, the National Defence Medal, Bronze Echelon to Major Francis Lavoie replace with the following: From the President of the French Republic the National Defence Medal, Bronze Echelon with "Armée de terre" clasp to Major Francis Lavoie.

See also

 2020 Australia Day Honours
 2020 New Year Honours (New Zealand)
 2020 British and Commonwealth honours
 2020 United Kingdom's Birthday honours list
 2020 Special Honours

References

Sources

 CANFORGEN 177/19 CMP 092/19 111607Z 19 DEC
 CANFORGEN 177/19 CMP 092/19 111607Z DEC 19

Monarchy in Canada
2020 awards in Canada
New Year Honours
Birthday Honours